Julie Annery (born 12 June 1995) is a French rugby union player. She plays for the France women's national rugby union team and Stade Français.

Annery was born in Sarcelles.

Career
Whilst playing for AC Bobigny 93 Rugby, who she joined aged 18, she was selected for the French squad for the 2017 World Cup.

, she had 26 international caps and was recognised as the fastest third line. In 2017 against England during the Women's World Cup, she was praised for her defensive solidity. She was named in France's team for the delayed 2021 Rugby World Cup in New Zealand.

References

 1995 births
Living people
French female rugby union players